Ha Tsuen is one of the 39 constituencies in the Yuen Long District of Hong Kong.

The constituency returns one district councillor to the Yuen Long District Council, with an election every four years. Ha Tsuen constituency is loosely based on Deep Bay Grove, Galore Garden, Ha Pak Nai, Ha Tsuen Shi, Kau Lee Uk Tsuen, Parkview Garden, San Lee Uk Tsuen, San Wai, Sha Chau Lei and Sheung Pak Nai in Ha Tsuen with estimated population of 15,332.

Councillors represented

Election results

2010s

References

Ping Shan
Constituencies of Hong Kong
Constituencies of Yuen Long District Council
1994 establishments in Hong Kong
Constituencies established in 1994